Sankt Margarethen im Burgenland  is a town in Burgenland near the state capital of Eisenstadt, in Austria. It is home to a large 1st-century Roman quarry. A passion play has been presented in St Margarethen each summer for over seventy years. The town is close to the border with Hungary. The Pan-European Picnic peace demonstration was held near St. Margarethen in 1989 at the close of the Cold War.

Roman Quarry

The Roman Quarry has recently been transformed to cutting edge event venue. The architecture blends with the natural surroundings. A corten steel ramp makes the quarry accessible to all audiences.

Population

References

Cities and towns in Eisenstadt-Umgebung District